Da Rin is a surname. Notable people with the surname include:

Alberto Da Rin (born 1939), Italian ice hockey player
Gianfranco Da Rin (born 1935), Italian ice hockey player, brother of Alberto
Giorgio Da Rin (born 1988), Italian curler
Renate Da Rin (born 1962), German journalist, editor, and publisher